This is a list of characters for the comedy-drama television series Gilmore Girls.

Main characters

Lorelai Gilmore

Lorelai Gilmore, played by Lauren Graham, is the only daughter of Richard and Emily Gilmore. She is the mother of Lorelai "Rory" Leigh Gilmore . She became pregnant at the age of 16 but refused to marry Christopher, Rory's father, because she felt that a marriage at such a young age would not work out. Instead, she ran away to the town of Stars Hollow, which is half an hour away from Hartford.

In Stars Hollow, she meets Mia, the owner of the Independence Inn. She begs Mia to hire her though she has no experience of any kind. Mia gave Lorelai a job as a maid and allows Lorelai and Rory to live in a converted potting shed behind the inn, where they live for most of Rory's early childhood. Lorelai eventually becomes the executive manager of the inn, which is the position she holds when the first season of the show opens.

When Rory is unexpectedly accepted to Chilton Preparatory School (from a waiting list), Lorelai is unable to come up with the tuition due immediately, Lorelai turns to her parents for help. They agree to it, if only the girls will attend dinner every Friday night and allow them into their lives. Later, Lorelai and her best friend Sookie St. James find an old run-down inn called the Dragonfly Inn. When its owner dies, they decide to purchase it. However, the Independence Inn is in a point of crisis due to a recent fire, causing the pair to question the timing of their new endeavor. Furthermore, Rory, by this time, has been accepted to Yale, and has been denied financial aid due to Lorelai receiving a one-time investment payout given to her by her father (see below). Lorelai is ready to divert her money for the purchase and renovation costs to Rory's tuition, but Rory independently turns to her grandparents for help with the tuition, allowing Lorelai and Sookie to purchase The Dragonfly Inn.

Lorelai is very witty and full of pop culture references. She has a very specific taste in movies, music, and TV. She has said she is a fan of the bands U2, Weezer, Metallica, and The Bangles. On Karaoke Night in season seven, she sings the song "I Will Always Love You" by Dolly Parton. Some of her favorite movies are The Way We Were, His Girl Friday, Funny Face, and Casablanca, which she claims has "no bad parts." She is also addicted to coffee, takeout food, and she loves to shop for clothes and shoes. When her father gives her a check for $75,000 because the government was building a road on a property that Richard bought under her name, she exclaims, "That's 150 pairs of Jimmy Choos!"

Lorelai and the local diner owner, Luke Danes, have a close relationship throughout the show but don't start dating until the fifth season. They broke up due to the meddling of her mother and her ex, Christopher. They later got back together when Emily, Lorelai's mother, went to Luke and told him she would no longer interfere if they got back together. They end up reuniting, get engaged, and are a couple through the sixth season until the season finale, when Lorelai gives him an ultimatum and they break up. Throughout most of the seventh and final season of the show, they aren't together because Lorelai starts dating and then marries Christopher, but she and Christopher break up about midway through the season. Lorelai and Luke presumably get back together at the end of the season, as she kisses him at Rory's farewell party and the next morning, wears the necklace he gave her as she and Rory eat breakfast at the diner.

In the revival, Lorelai is living with Luke, but the two have not married; a major plot point throughout the first two episodes is their exploration of having children together, which ultimately does not happen. At a party after Richard's funeral, a drunken Lorelai speaks about Richard in a manner that Emily deems disrespectful; this sparks a months-long period of silence and resentment between Lorelai and Emily. Lorelai and Emily enter therapy sessions together, but Emily ultimately abandons the sessions, claiming that Lorelai has neglected to change her hurtful behavior. Frustrated with her life and desiring self-discovery, Lorelai leaves Stars Hollow to engage in a trek across the California wilderness inspired by the Cheryl Strayed book Wild: From Lost to Found on the Pacific Crest Trail. She begins the journey, but has an epiphany and calls her mother to share a warm recollection of her father; she and Emily reconcile. Abandoning her plan for the hike, Lorelai returns to Stars Hollow and proposes marriage to Luke, and the two marry on November 5, 2016.

Rory Gilmore

Lorelai "Rory" Gilmore, played by Alexis Bledel, is the only child of Lorelai Gilmore and Christopher Hayden, born on October 8, 1984, at 4:03 a.m. It is evident in the show that Rory and Lorelai share a special bond, and may even be considered best friends. Rory shares her mother's taste in junk food, coffee, movies, music, and much more. They both exhibit a talent for witty, fast-paced, pop-culture-laden dialogue. Rory spent her childhood in the Independence Inn in Stars Hollow where her mother originally worked as a maid. Lorelai was later able to buy a house in town when Rory was 11, and they remain there throughout the end of the show. The series pilot indicates that Rory harbors a long-held dream to study at Harvard University, and it is, for this reason, she transfers from Stars Hollow public high school to the prestigious Chilton Academy. She attends Chilton for her sophomore, junior, and senior years of high school. Lorelai is forced to ask her parents for help to pay Chilton's tuition fees, ending their relative-estrangement since Lorelai moved out when Rory was a baby. Rory grows close to her wealthy grandparents, Emily and Richard, although she also comes into conflict with them periodically. The developing relationship between grandparents and granddaughter is also a source of contention between Rory and Lorelai. Rory has little contact with her father Christopher Hayden and his family.

Before leaving Stars Hollow High School, Rory meets schoolmate Dean Forester, who becomes her first steady boyfriend. Rory and Dean date for two and a half seasons before Dean ends the relationship, alleging she has been attracted to Jess Mariano, the nephew of Luke Danes since he first arrived in Stars Hollow. As it turns out, he is absolutely correct, as Rory and Jess have a magnetic connection to each other. Rory and Jess date in season three, but trust and communication issues plague the relationship, and it ends when Jess departs for California shortly before Rory graduates from Chilton. During her time at Chilton, Rory becomes engaged in a feud with a close academic rival, Paris Geller. Though the two later become friends, their relationship remains characterized by a rivalry that continues into their university studies. Rory achieves much academic success and applies to Ivy League universities, Princeton, Harvard, and Yale. She also reluctantly runs for student government with Paris and wins, and writes for the Chilton paper, The Franklin.

After graduating from Chilton as valedictorian, Rory attends Yale University in season four, having decided that the benefits of Yale outweighed her dream of studying at Harvard in season three. Rory majors in English and pursues her interest in journalism; she wants to be a foreign correspondent and her role-model is Christiane Amanpour. She writes for the Yale Daily News and is its editor towards the end of her studies. Rory later reconnects to now married Dean and they ultimately sleep together. When Lorelai discovers it, Rory leaves for Europe with her grandmother for the summer. Dean separates from Lindsay, his wife, and the pair date during Rory's sophomore year in season five. While at Yale, Rory makes the acquaintance of Logan Huntzberger and the two embark on a relationship later on. Rory interns at the Stamford Eagle Gazette, one of the newspapers run by Logan's father, Mitchum Huntzberger. When Mitchum makes upsetting remarks about Rory's aptitude for journalism, Rory becomes confused and decides to take a year off from Yale, which leads to a heated argument between her and Lorelai. She moves into her grandparents’ pool house for a long period. Eventually, Rory makes up with Lorelai and goes back to Yale.

Rory and Logan cement their relationship despite his post-graduation spell working in London, England, and a failed business endeavor. At Rory's own graduation party, Logan unexpectedly proposes marriage and asks her to move to Palo Alto, California, with him. She ultimately declines, suggesting they try to maintain a long-distance relationship. She says that she relishes the openness of her life and the opportunities before her: marriage now would limit that. Logan, however, finds the prospect of “going backwards” in their relationship unappealing and issues the ultimatum that it is “all or nothing”. Rory wordlessly returns his engagement ring and Logan walks away. In the series finale, Rory is offered the opportunity to become a reporter for that magazine and to travel with other journalists covering Barack Obama's presidential campaign and his bid for the Democratic Party nomination, when another reporter drops out at the last moment. She accepts and faces the challenge of entering the world of work and leaving her mother behind in Stars Hollow.

In the revival, she is in a rut professionally and personally. She is unhappily dating a young man named Paul and, in a recurring joke, continually forgets to break up with him; at the same time, she is maintaining a covert casual relationship with an engaged Logan and has a one-night stand with an unnamed man in a Wookiee costume. After a series of professional rejections, she gives up journalism to instead write a Gilmore family history, an idea suggested by Jess. This initially causes tension between her and Lorelai, who does not want her personal history and family conflicts retold for a public audience; Lorelai eventually accepts Rory's decision to write the book. The series ends with Rory telling Lorelai that she is pregnant.

Sookie St. James

Sookie St. James, played by Melissa McCarthy, is the loving best friend of Lorelai Gilmore. While being a bit on the klutzy side, 

Sookie maintains her position as the executive chef at the Independence Inn and later, the co-owner and head chef at the Dragonfly Inn.

Throughout the series, Sookie is Lorelai's business partner and cheerleader. Sookie shares a somewhat antagonistic relationship with Michel, the hotel's front desk clerk. She is also the one person who consistently champions Lorelai and Luke's romantic relationship, even long before the two were actually involved.

She dates and later marries Jackson Belleville, a sweet but whiny vegetable farmer with an extremely odd family. They eventually have two children: David "Davey" Edward and Martha Janice. At the end of the series, Sookie is again pregnant.

In the revival, she left the Dragonfly Inn for a planned 6.5 month exploration of her culinary talent on a retreat which involuntarily turns into a permanent leave. After an absence of two years, she returns to prepare Luke and Lorelai's wedding cake.

Alex Borstein, the real-life wife of actor Jackson Douglas, who plays Jackson Belleville, was originally cast in the role of Sookie St. James, but had to back out due to scheduling conflicts, mostly voicing Lois Griffin on the animated Fox series Family Guy. Instead, she has taken miscellaneous supporting roles throughout the show, including Drella, the harpist from season 1, and Miss Celine in seasons 3 and 5.

At the 2015 ATX Television Festival, show creator Amy Sherman-Palladino stated that she had initially intended for Sookie to be gay. She told the Huffington Post, "Things were different back then. The networks were very different in how permissive they would allow you to be. So, Sookie was originally supposed to be gay, but that was a non-starter at that time."

Lane Kim
Lane Hyun-kyung Kim, later Lane Van Gerbig, played by Keiko Agena, is Rory's loving best friend. She was born and raised in Stars Hollow. She is the rock-and-roll loving child of strict Christian/Korean/Vegan parents. (Lane's father, known 

only as Mr. Kim, is never seen on camera, nor are his whereabouts ever mentioned; but Lane refers to her father in season 1, episode 1, and to her "parents" on many other occasions, and specifically refers to "my mother and father" in season 2. On one occasion, a faceless man drives Lane to the airport to visit Korean relatives for the summer. In the revival, we finally meet Mr. Kim, albeit briefly, when Lane and Rory wave to him at the International Foods Festival.) At a very young age, Lane was forced to start hiding her interests and hobbies from her family, and she uses loose floorboards and the back of her closet to hide her enormous collection of non-Christian music, books and cosmetics against her mother's strong disapproval. Lane and her best friend Rory Gilmore use hollowed-out books and a variety of other pretexts and subterfuge in an attempt to help Lane live a more mainstream life. She constantly complains of her mother's over-protectiveness and strictness, which she views as trying to control her life.

Lane attends Stars Hollow High along with Rory Gilmore until Rory begins attending Chilton Academy in her sophomore year. Lane is a cheerleader, member of the marching band, and describes herself as a "dedicated audiophile" and music fanatic. Eventually, she joins a band consisting of Dave Rygalski (Adam Brody), Brian Fuller (John Cabrera), and Zack Van Gerbig (Todd Lowe). Lane and Dave begin a romantic relationship that largely involves intricate strategies for hiding their relationship from her mother and their bandmates until, in season 3, they are forced by circumstances to make their relationship public and Dave is allowed to take Lane to Prom only because her mother believes Dave to be a devout Christian. The following year, Dave moves to California to attend college. Sebastian Bach's character, Gil, replaces Dave on guitar, and Zack replaces Dave as Lane's romantic interest. During the period of Rory and Lorelai's estrangement from each other in season 6, Lane's relationship with her mother and with her band are featured more prominently than in prior years. In season 6, the band splits up but later reunites when Zack proposes marriage to Lane while she is working at Luke's Diner, and they are married shortly thereafter. In season 7, Lane becomes pregnant with twins. At the end of "Gilmore Girls Only" (Season 7, Episode 17), Lane gives birth to twin boys, Kwan and Steve. At the end of the show, Lane's husband Zack gets an offer to go on tour with another band and she is left home with the twins. Her last appearance in the series is in the series finale "Bon Voyage" (Season 7, Episode 22).

In the revival, she's taken over her parents' store, Kim's Antiques, and lives with Zach and the twins in the former home of Sookie and Jackson. 

Lane Kim's character may be modeled by Amy Sherman-Palladino after her best friend Helen Pai.

Michel Gerard

Michel Gerard, played by Yanic Truesdale, is a French concierge who works at the Independence Inn with Lorelai and Sookie. He eats a very strict diet and is very style conscious. He has a history of having little patience for rude guests and can himself be rude when conducting business, throwing tantrums that Lorelai has to talk him down from. However, it is understood that he is highly skilled at his job and that Lorelai and Sookie consider him a valuable member of their team. During the time that Lorelai and Sookie are switching over to the Dragonfly Inn, Michel is worried that they aren't going to bring him along. They reassure Michel that they really do care about him. While Michel is typically indifferent or uncaring towards children and babies, he dotes on his Chow Chow dogs, brothers named Paw-paw and Chin-chin. Before the test run for the Dragonfly Inn he even asserted that he cared for his dogs as much as Lorelai cared for Rory. Though Chin Chin died later in the series, Michel continued to be devoted to the surviving dog, Paw-Paw. Michel is also obsessed with Destiny's Child, particularly shown when Sookie wouldn't let him take his blueberry pancakes unless he had sworn an 'oath' – "may Destiny's Child break up if I [Michel] count these blueberries" – after which he responded that she should pick another group. The counting would be because Michel was only 'allowed' 12 blueberries per day, as his strict diet would prescribe him. When she declined, he left his pancakes. Throughout the series, Michel continues to have a strict diet and exhibits other behaviors characteristic of disordered eating. Michel shows an even greater fondness towards Celine Dion, as he has attended many of her concerts. Once he leaves Lorelai hanging without a male date to bring to Lane's wedding to Zach, even though she needed a date to go, so that he could attend a Celine Dion concert. He also has an appreciation for the "finer things," and therefore has a great respect for Lorelai's mother Emily and her lifestyle. In season 7 episode 3, Michel escorts Lorelai to her first cotillion, and dances with her. He has a giggly girlfriends-like relationship with his mother, which he insists is maintained by only discussing superficial topics and never divulging the details of his personal life. While he often expresses to the other citizens of Stars Hollow his contempt for them, this is an exaggeration, as he does occasionally let down his guard and enjoy their company. Throughout the series, he appears to have grown in affection for Lorelai, Sookie, Rory, and the other people of Stars Hollow, and has generally become more laid-back and friendly.

In the revival, it is revealed has been recently married; Michel now has plans to have children with his husband. He considers leaving the Dragonfly Inn before Lorelai expands it.

Luke Danes

Lucas "Luke" Danes, played by Scott Patterson, is the owner of "Luke's Diner" in Stars Hollow, Connecticut. His mother died when he was young, leaving his father to raise Luke and his sister, Liz. In season two, Luke reveals Liz left the town 

at the earliest opportunity and is a constant source of trouble to him, not least with her numerous ill-fated relationships and failed careers. By contrast, Luke is dependable, hard-working and something of a traditionalist. After his father's death, Luke converted the family hardware store to the diner, having worked there in his youth. He keeps most of the original architecture intact as a way of honoring his father, with whom it is implied he was close.

Luke has a gruff, world-weary personality, but his image softens as the series progresses, and his willingness to help friends and family becomes apparent. He is close to both Rory and Lorelai, who are very frequent customers in his diner. He has grown very fond of them over the years and is shown offering them practical assistance in their home, at Lorelai's Inn and in moments of crisis. He notoriously disapproves of the mother and daughter's coffee-drinking and junk-food diet. Early in the show, he expresses concern for the environmental impact of golf courses and complains that the American Revolution was a war fought to hold stolen land, indicating that he has deeply considered opinions about history and the world in general.

In season one, Luke and Lorelai's relationship begins to grow from playful antagonism to true friendship, and it is evident that Luke has romantic feelings for Lorelai. However, his attempts to express his feelings are continuously thwarted, often by other people, such as Lorelai's on-again, off-again boyfriend Max Medina and Luke's similarly intermittent girlfriend, Rachel (played by Lisa Ann Hadley). Rachel is a photographer who travels the world for months at a time, and in the past she has returned to Luke and abruptly left him numerous times, causing him much heartbreak. She returns in season one, promising that she will remain permanently, but she leaves at the end of the season when it becomes clear that Luke has developed feelings for Lorelai.

When Lorelai announces her engagement to Max, Luke pretends to be happy for her but also draws attention to how little she knows Max. He later apologizes and presents her with a wedding gift: a chuppah for Max and her to stand under for the ceremony. He is very happy when the engagement is called off in season two.

Later in season two, Liz sends her son, Jess, to live with Luke. Jess has been in trouble in New York City, though the details remain vague, and Liz is unable or unwilling to deal with the issue. According to both Luke and Jess, Liz is unreliable and unstable. Luke and Jess's relationship is difficult. They are in some ways very similar, sharing anti-social, sarcastic, and pessimistic traits. But Jess's problems with authority and Luke's inexperience at parenting cause communication problems and arguments between them. Luke sends an unresisting Jess back to New York after a car accident in which Jess is driving and Rory fractures her wrist. Lorelai blames Luke in an angry confrontation and they are estranged for some months.

Jess returns in the season two finale and promises to obey Luke's rules but their communication problems remain and Jess fails to graduate from high school – one of Luke's conditions for staying in Stars Hollow – missing too many days of school in order to work full-time hours at Walmart. Luke angrily issues the ultimatum that Jess retakes senior year and graduates, or leaves. Jess leaves to find his father in Venice Beach, California, and Luke feels he failed his nephew. Jess returns in season 4 and Luke and he argue about Liz's newest boyfriend; when Luke pressures Jess to intervene in his mother's life, Jess accuses Luke of attempting to change people for their own good but pressuring them too hard: when they fail, they feel worse because they also failed him. Luke is upset and it is one of the rare occasions when he gets drunk. Later in season four, he confronts Jess in New York for wasting his life and declining the invitation to his mother's wedding. Out of feeling for his uncle, Jess returns to Stars Hollow for the event, although the two come to blows during the bachelor party when Luke breaks up a fight between Jess and his new stepfather. Luke offers Jess romantic advice which Jess takes to heart and they part on good terms. Jess promises to pay Luke back and expresses his gratitude, while Luke promises he will always be there for his nephew. In season six, during an open day for Jess's publisher and place of work, Truncheon Books, Philadelphia, Luke tells Jess he is proud of him and what he has achieved, and reluctantly accepts Jess's check for “what’s owed”.

In season two, Luke buys the building next door to him in order to renovate his apartment and make it large enough for both him and Jess to live in. In season three, Taylor Doose, the town selectman and frequent antagonist to Luke, rents the store beside the diner. Luke consequently meets and dates Nicole Leahy (played by Tricia O’Kelly), Taylor's lawyer. His affection for Lorelai causes friction between them, and his difficulties with Jess result in Luke making a bad impression on Nicole's parents. However, while on a cruise, they impulsively get married but decide to divorce when they return. Despite trying again with the relationship, it ends when Nicole has an affair. Luke is arrested when he takes his frustration out on the lover's car. The relationship with Nicole brings a degree of distance between Luke and Lorelai, who is hurt by the suddenness of his decisions and his neglecting to confide in her. However, she bails him out of jail and repairs their friendship.

In season four, after denying his feelings for Lorelai for years, Luke realizes that he is in love with her with the assistance of a self-help course. Luke invites Lorelai to his sister's wedding and the two kiss at the season finale. They date for much of season 5, to the displeasure of Lorelai's parents, who dislike Luke's blue collar status. Emily encourages Christopher, Rory's father, to pursue Lorelai and oust Luke. At Emily and Richard's vow-renewal, Luke, Christopher, and Lorelai discover Rory in a compromising position with Logan Huntzberger and Christopher and Luke argue about their respective importance and involvement in Rory's life; Christopher proclaims that Rory is his daughter, and Luke declares that he has cared more for Rory during her life while Christopher was absent. Luke lists that he took care of her when she was sick with chickenpox, attended her high school graduation and helped her move into Yale. Christopher affirms that he and Lorelai belong together, revealing Emily's intervention and a previous meeting with Lorelai after the death of Christopher's father which Luke was unaware of. Saddened and angered, Luke distances himself from Lorelai because of her lie of omission and because Christopher and her disapproving parents will always be in her life. He ends their relationship but after Emily reassures him that Lorelai loves him and they face no more opposition from Emily herself, he reunites with Lorelai. At the end of season 5, Lorelai proposes marriage to him when she sees how much he cares for Rory, who has stolen a yacht and dropped out of Yale. He accepts, although they delay marriage plans until Rory and Lorelai reconcile.

In season six, April Nardini (Vanessa Marano), age 12, appears at the diner and unexpectedly takes a sample of Luke's hair to determine who her father is for a science fair project. Luke is confirmed as the father and though April and her mother Anna Nardini (Sherilyn Fenn) initially want nothing from him, Luke feels both duty and desire to be in his daughter's life. After some awkwardness, they become close. Unsure how to integrate April into his life with Lorelai, Luke deliberately hides April's existence from Lorelai until April herself unwittingly reveals the truth over two months later. Feeling betrayed and hurt that Luke broke his own injunction against secrets, Lorelai questions their future marriage. Luke asks to postpone the wedding to get to know April and excludes Lorelai from interacting with April until some undefined point in future. April's mother also forbids Lorelai from becoming involved in April's life until after they are married because April needs stability. Lorelai is upset and resentful of waiting in a relationship which has already taken so long to develop, although she feigns complacency. In the finale of season 6, Lorelai gives Luke an ultimatum: either elope and get married immediately or break up. Luke attempts to talk her out of it, and Lorelai leaves. Luke reconsiders and offers to make the relationship work on Lorelai's terms, but when she reveals she slept with Christopher the night of the ultimatum, Luke is stunned. Their relationship is over and they are distant for some time.

Luke's relationship with April is threatened when Anna announces she is moving to New Mexico to be with her ailing mother and taking April with her. Luke fights for partial custody and wins with the help of a letter by Lorelai about his merits as a friend and father.

In the final episode of the series, Luke throws a surprise going-away party for Rory and stays up the entire night sewing tarpaulins together to protect it from the expected rain. Sookie informs Lorelai about Luke's efforts and Lorelai thanks him. The couple kiss when Luke confesses he wanted to make Lorelai happy. In the series’ final scene, Lorelai returns to her former habit of flirting with Luke, wearing a necklace he gave her, strongly implying that the pair rekindled their romance.

In the revival, Luke and Lorelai have been in a committed relationship, living together, since 2007. They are unmarried. Neither of them has brought up marriage nor children in all their years together. They decide to get married in November 2016, after Lorelai spends a year mourning the death of her father.

Emily Gilmore

Emily Gilmore, played by Kelly Bishop, is the mother of Lorelai and grandmother to Rory. Emily had very limited contact with her daughter for most of her adult life, and though they have gotten to know each other better as adults, they still have a somewhat strained relationship. One constant source of discord between them involves the matter of Christopher Hayden, Rory's father. Despite Chris's shortcomings, Emily always pushed Lorelai to pursue a relationship with him in their adulthood, so that their family can finally be together, only to be frustrated as either Lorelai or Christopher failed to take the necessary steps to make it happen. Emily always dotes on Rory (she being their only grandchild), however, and she and Richard made it financially possible for Rory to attend the exclusive Chilton Preparatory School as well as Yale University.

Emily was raised by a strict social code and graduated from Smith College with a degree in history. She has a sister named Hope, who lives in Paris. Since her marriage, she has dedicated herself to furthering her husband Richard's career. As a result, she spends much of her time arranging charity events, and she is very concerned with propriety and appearances. She is difficult to please, and is incapable of keeping a maid very long no matter how well she pays them. They quit or are fired in rapid succession for reasons like singing or walking too heavily. Many people have judged her to be a snobbish, haughty, and highly opinionated woman. There is a softer, more caring side to Emily, but it is often obscured by her aforementioned snobbish persona.

Emily is heavily involved in Hartford society. Besides being a member of the Daughters of the American Revolution, (D.A.R) she is also a member of the Symphony Fundraising Committee, the President of the Horticultural Society, and a co-chair of the Starlight Foundation. She is a board member on the Hartford Zoological Silent Auction, the Mark Twain House Restoration Fund Luncheon, and the Harriet Beecher Stowe Literacy Auction.

In season 4, it is revealed that Richard has been having yearly lunches with Pennilyn Lott (his ex-girlfriend) without telling Emily. This damages her relationship with Richard, and his choices to conceal information from her almost leads to divorce. Emily and Richard separate during season 5, and Emily tries dating another man. Though the date goes well, it primarily makes Emily realize how much she misses Richard. They soon reconcile and renew their vows.

In season 6, Emily and Richard take Rory in after she drops out of Yale and argues with Lorelai. This eventually leads to conflict between Emily and Rory when Rory moves out of the grandparents house, feeling she has not realized her potential and that Emily is too controlling. Emily becomes very upset and even considers buying an airplane as a form of retail therapy, comparing Rory's sudden departure to Lorelai's years earlier.

Emily becomes upset when, shortly after moving out, Rory accepts money from her father to pay for Yale. Lorelai forces Emily, Richard, and Rory to attempt to work things out in episode 6.13 "Friday Night's Alright for Fighting". Somewhat comically, one fight between Emily and Rory leads to a snowball effect in which the entire family argues about years of unresolved issues, and as a result, Rory and Lorelai resume Friday night dinners to mend fences. Things remain tense for some time between Emily, Lorelai, and Rory, but they eventually reconcile. When the series ends and Rory goes off to begin a reporting career, Emily believes that their weekly dinners will end since Lorelai and Rory no longer need monetary support. However, much to her surprise, Lorelai agrees to continue going to dinner every Friday night, saying she's gotten used to it.

In the revival, she spends a year mourning Richard's death. She and Lorelai feud after a drunken Lorelai tells an unflattering story about Richard at his funeral. The two enter therapy sessions together, which Emily terminates because of her dissatisfaction with Lorelai's unchanged behavior towards her, and finally reconcile when Lorelai calls her and shares a fond memory of Richard with her. Emily experiences increasing dissatisfaction with her life in Hartford, culminating in a vicious argument with her fellow DAR members that leads to her membership being revoked. Empowered by newfound distance from her old life, Emily sells the Gilmore family house and purchases two adjoining homes in Nantucket, one for herself and her maid's family and one as a vacation home for Luke and Lorelai. She is shown working at the Whaling Museum, thrilling an audience of young children with her grandiose and gory whaling tales. She keeps a portrait of Richard in her new home and gently touches it, showing her lasting affection for him.

Richard Gilmore

Richard Gilmore (1944-2014), played by Edward Herrmann, is the father of Lorelai and grandfather of Rory. He has a relatively more comfortable relationship with 

Lorelai than his wife, Emily, which is highlighted in season 5, episode 16 "So... Good Talk" when Lorelai agrees to meet with him, even though she is angry at Emily for ending her relationship with Luke. He is an alumnus of Yale, where he sang with the Whiffenpoofs, and plays a pivotal role in persuading Rory and Lorelai to consider applying to the school, and his status helps get Rory admitted there.

Richard and Rory develop a very close grandfather–granddaughter relationship which serves to ease the frequent tension between Emily and Lorelai at the Friday Night Dinners. Emily and Richard have a very conventional husband-wife relationship which has often served as an example of uptightness of Lorelai's previous social circles. They separate at the end of the fourth season, only to reconcile midway through the fifth.

Richard works as a top-level executive in an insurance company until the second season, when he becomes frustrated after noticing that he is gradually being phased out. After a brief flirtation with retirement, Richard quickly becomes bored and goes back into insurance work for himself and soon takes on Jason Stiles as a business partner. His old company welcomes him back in the 5th season and he finally returns to Yale to teach an economics course in the 7th season. He suffers a heart attack during a lecture, which Rory was attending. When he recovers, it brings the family closer together.

Richard died four months before the beginning of the events that take place in the series' 2016 revival. Richard's funeral was shown in flashbacks and served as a pivotal plot point for Lorelai and Emily's narrative arcs over the course of the miniseries. Sitting at Richard's desk in his study, Rory writes the first chapters of the Gilmore family history.

Paris Geller

Paris Eustace Geller, played by Liza Weil, is introduced in the second episode of season 1 and makes her last appearance in the penultimate episode of season 7. The child of wealthy Jewish parents, she was raised almost completely by her Portuguese nanny. Initially, Paris is threatened by Rory's academic prowess, which is compounded by her schoolmate crush, Tristin Dugray (Chad Michael Murray), budding interest in Rory.

Her two best friends at Chilton are Madeline and Louise, although their focus is fashion and dating in contrast to Paris' dedication to academics. Paris and Rory's rivalry continues unabated and periods of hostility arise, but after Paris and Rory bond at a Bangles concert in New York, they slowly become close friends. Both Paris and Rory share a dream of studying at Harvard, but both attend Yale in season four: Paris is heartbroken when she is rejected by Harvard, the university her family has attended for generations.

In season three, Paris starts her first romantic relationship with a Princeton student, Jamie (Brandon Barash). Rory is her reluctant adviser about dating and counsels Paris when she loses her virginity to Jamie. Paris ends the relationship with Jamie in season four when she starts an affair with a much older man and a Yale professor, Asher Fleming (Michael York). The affair ends when Asher dies while the two are summering at Oxford. Paris starts to date Yale Daily News editor Doyle McMaster (Danny Strong) after exhaustion during a speed dating session the two attend, and eventually moves in with him, though involuntarily as her parents fled the country to avoid tax evasion charges at the start of the sixth season, leaving Paris without any financial means outside of loans and a closed trust not yet opened due to her age. Paris attends Yale also and is roommates with Rory for all four years. She is finally accepted into Harvard Medical School towards the end of the series. Paris is consistently nervous about meeting standards and is often angry when annoyed, having an extreme Type A personality.

In the revival, it was revealed that she went into reproductive medicine, running a successful surrogacy/fertility clinic in New York known as Dynasty Makers, which Lorelai and Luke visit while considering having a child of their own. She has two children of her own with Doyle; a girl, Gabriela, and a boy, Timóteo (likely named for the Brazilian city), though she is in the middle of a separation with Doyle (who has become a successful Hollywood screenwriter) over the course of her arc. She also still holds her crush on Tristin Dugray, and upon seeing him from afar during a student day in Chilton, lashes out about not meeting the expectations of others. In an argument with Francine Jarvis a few moments later, it is revealed that she additionally passed the bar and has a law practice license, is an expert on classical architecture, and may also be a certified dental technician.

The character of Paris was originally created for a three-episode guest arc by series creator Amy Sherman-Palladino and executive producer Gavin Polone at the beginning of the show's first season to introduce the high pressures, competitiveness, and stress of Rory's transition from a small public high school in Stars Hollow to the elite institution of Chilton. This character was created for Weil after a strong audition for the role of Rory, which eventually went to Alexis Bledel. Weil was known to Polone through her supporting role in the 1998 Kevin Bacon film Stir of Echoes, which was produced by Polone, and was under a talent holding deal with Warner Bros. at the time which saw her previously guest star on The West Wing and ER. Weil dyed her hair from brown to blonde for the part of Paris to highlight the contrast between Paris and Rory. The character proved to be the ideal foil to Rory, and the role of Paris was expanded through the first season until Weil became a series regular in the second season.

Dean Forester

Dean Forester, played by Jared Padalecki, was a main character in season 2 and 3, while he was a recurring guest star in seasons 1, 4, and 5. He is introduced as the new guy in town in the "Pilot". He entered into a relationship with Rory Gilmore (Alexis Bledel) after she shows him around Stars Hollow. Rory in turn quickly becomes infatuated with him, and he becomes the first serious boyfriend for Rory. Later, however, Jess Mariano is introduced. Although the couple were having problems before Jess, their relationship is further strained after Rory spends more time with Jess. Dean is eventually driven to jealousy by Jess' presence, and this leads to the end of his relationship with Rory. His parents' names are Barbara and Randall, and he has a sister named Clara Forester, played by Scout Taylor-Compton. It is also suggested that he may have an older sibling.

Dean later starts dating a girl named Lindsay Lister (Arielle Kebbel). Although his attraction to Rory remains so strong that, at a party, when he discovers that Jess made her cry, he violently attacks Jess, resulting in a brawl between the two (in the end, Dean threw the first punch of the fight, and the last). Dean and Rory do not rekindle their relationship as Dean remains with Lindsay and soon impulsively marries her. However, it is still obvious that he carries strong feelings for Rory. On the night before his wedding to Lindsay, Dean expresses to Luke that he feels Rory is the only girl he can marry, later forgetting the statement. Dean remains too close to Rory, and when it becomes clear to him that he's made a mistake in marrying Lindsay, he goes to Rory and starts an affair: Rory's first sexual experience.

Lorelai accidentally finds out about the affair (as she comes home while Dean is leaving Rory's room) and becomes angry with their actions, saying she did not raise Rory to be "the type of girl who sleeps with someone else's husband", which briefly complicates things with Rory. Dean and Lindsay's relationship is later ended, Lindsay having found out about their affair (through a letter Rory sent to Dean while she was away with her grandmother in Europe). Although it seems unclear if Rory and Dean will get back together (due to Dean's guilt and the turmoil in which his marriage was ended), he decides to rekindle his romance with Rory (even though she now lives at Yale). This aggravates many people in their lives including Luke and Rory's grandparents (who judge Dean unworthy of Rory) and Dean's parents (who are seen as being courteous to Rory but with much effort as they are upset over the situation). To make matters worse, Dean and Rory find their lives heading in completely different directions. With Rory rarely in Stars Hollow due to her life at Yale and Dean holding three jobs at once to make ends meet, the two of them rarely find time to spend together; both cancel date after date due to their commitments and somewhat problematic living situations.

The two finally find time for a date; it would be planned that Dean would pick Rory up after a party that her grandparents planned to throw for her. However, the party was thrown with the sole purpose of introducing Rory to other prospective blue blooded boyfriends with business aspirations, including Rory's next boyfriend, Logan Huntzberger. Rory enjoys herself at the party so much that she briefly forgets about her planned outing. She eventually remembers, and by the time she walks out to a furious Dean, the two realize that their lives were heading in different directions, and Dean ends their relationship for good.

In his final appearance in "To Live And Let Diorama", Dean does not see Rory, but rather Luke. Dean relates his faulty relationship with Rory to Luke's relationship with Lorelai, saying that ultimately, Luke would hold Lorelai back from whatever potential she may have. With this statement, Dean is never seen or heard from again. He does, however, appear in one episode of the 2016 miniseries Gilmore Girls: A Year in the Life.

In the revival, he runs into Rory in Doose's market. He's visiting his parents, but he lives in Scranton with his second wife and kids. Rory tells him she is thankful for their relationship and how he taught her "what safe feels like." They part amicably.

Jess Mariano

Jess Mariano, played by Milo Ventimiglia, was a main character in seasons two and three, and recurring afterward in seasons four and six. He first appears in the episode "Nick & Nora, Sid & Nancy", arriving in Stars Hollow from New York. He is sent to live with his uncle Luke by his mother and Luke's sister, Liz (Kathleen Wilhoite), who raised him as a single-mother after the departure of Jess's father, Jimmy Mariano (later played by Rob Estes). Although the reasons for his move remain vaguely defined, Luke reports that Jess had been "getting into some trouble", including "staying out late, getting rowdy", and possibly "heading for something bad", and "had a fight with Liz's boyfriend", so Liz is sending Jess to Luke to "straighten him out." Stars Hollow subsequently plays host to his pranks, petty theft, caustic attitude, and schoolyard fights. Rebellious and resentful, Jess appears a typical 'bad boy' but is revealed to be a great reader with similar eclectic tastes in music and pop culture to Rory. Though similarly intellectually inclined, his low scholastic ambition contrasts with Rory's aspiration, but the two become friends despite others' disapproval.

In addition to the townspeople's general dislike, Lorelai and Rory's boyfriend, Dean, are particularly suspicious of him after each experience early confrontations with Jess's risky behavior and bad attitude. Luke and Jess have a difficult relationship fraught by Jess's resentment and Luke's unpracticed attempts at parenting, although the tension between them is often relieved by humorous mutual antagonism. Luke's care for his nephew is shown, for instance, when he attempts to conceal the fact that Liz does not want Jess back in New York for Christmas. Jess sees through the deception, and his hatred of his mother surfaces periodically.Jess pursues Rory with differing degrees of subtlety while she is in a relationship with Dean, and Rory struggles with the split in her affections and loyalties as her attraction to Jess mounts. A car accident during an illicit break from a tutoring session leaves Rory with a fractured wrist and Jess back in New York. Rory uncharacteristically skips school in an unplanned trip to visit him in Washington Square Park. Jess similarly unexpectedly returns to Stars Hollow in the season two finale, and Rory impetuously kisses him and leaves, begging him to be silent about it. The two are separated over the summer, and in the season three premiere, Rory returns home from a student government stay in Washington to find Jess dating another girl and angry at Rory's lack of communication with him.

Jess and Rory begin dating after the town's annual dance marathon, where Dean breaks up with Rory over her barely concealed attraction to Jess. The couple experience problems with jealousy and communication, and Jess and Dean's mutual enmity causes tension in their relationship. Lorelai and Jess do not warm to one another. Rory's grandmother Emily also questions Lorelai's permission for the relationship when Jess's first and last appearance at Friday night dinner is marked by his lateness, curtness, and an unexplained black-eye which culminates in an argument with Rory and him leaving, stranding Rory at the Gilmore mansion overnight.

Jess is shown attending school less often, working increasingly long hours, secretly at first, for Walmart. Though Jess says he has the situation under control, Luke is concerned enough to secretly steal Jess's car to encourage him back to school by preventing him from traveling to work. However, Jess is informed he missed 31 days of school and cannot graduate unless he retakes his senior year, which he is unwilling to do. Jess's life grows more difficult after a fight with Rory, when she tries to find out why he's upset, but he tries to find physical comfort rather than tell her he's failed out of school. Confused by his emotional distance, Rory leaves their encounter in tears, causing Dean to pick a fight with Jess. Rory and Jess don't know how to approach each other after their fight. A visit from his estranged father Jimmy prompts an angry exchange between Jess and Luke, and Luke issues an ultimatum: Jess must retake senior year and graduate, or leave. Jess leaves for Venice Beach, California to stay with his unwitting father, and without telling either Luke or Rory. The WB was originally going to continue Jess's storyline in a spin-off called Windward Circle, intended to debut mid-season in January 2004. The Gilmore Girls episode 3.21 "Here Comes the Son" acted as a backdoor pilot. However, the network canceled the show before it aired, citing high production costs to shoot on location in Venice Beach as the reason. The premise was for Jess to build his relationship with his estranged father and befriend some local skateboarders.

Jess returns to Stars Hollow in season four to steal his car back from Luke on intelligence from Liz. Luke and Jess argue over his earlier disappearance. Another more heated exchange is sparked by Luke's attempt to encourage Jess to intervene in his mother's lovelife, when Jess speaks angrily of his resentment of Luke's paternal interference and his own feeling of failure. Jess also sees Rory on several occasions, but he leaves each time without speaking to her. Eventually, he unexpectedly declares his love for her, but leaves again without her replying. A few months later, Jess returns again to Stars Hollow to attend Liz's wedding on Luke's request. Jess visits Rory's dorm at Yale and asks her to run away with him, saying they are meant to be together and affirming that he has changed and she can rely on him. Rory declines and later acts on a growing closeness with married ex-boyfriend Dean. She confides in friend Lane that Jess was appealing in his tastes and attractiveness, but contrasts his unreliability unfavorably with Dean's dependable nature. Jess and Luke reconcile after an argument at T.J.'s bachelor party and some shared romantic advice.

In season six, Jess returns to give Rory a copy of a short novel he has written called The Subsect. He finds her at the Gilmore mansion during her period of estrangement from Lorelai over dropping out of Yale. Jess describes his life in Philadelphia working for the publisher of his book, Truncheon. He attributes getting his life on track to her and tells her he "couldn't have done it without you." Their plans for dinner are interrupted by the early return of Rory's boyfriend Logan from a visit to one of the Huntzberger newspapers in Omaha. A tense evening is cut short when the escalating hostility between Jess and Logan results in Jess storming out of the restaurant. When Rory follows him and tries to make excuses for Logan's behavior, Jess confronts her about her life choices. He insists he knows her better than anyone and "this isn't you". The two part awkwardly, though he wishes her a belated happy birthday. Jess's final appearance is in season six in "The Real Paul Anka", where he and Rory meet in Philadelphia at an open house for Truncheon. Luke also attends and introduces his nephew to his daughter, April, while Jess presses a check on his uncle to pay him back "what's owed." Later, Rory praises Jess's novel, and the two talk about her role as editor of the Yale Daily News, leading Jess to observe that she is happier than when he last saw her. Jess says he's happy Rory came, and they share a kiss, but Rory confesses she is still with Logan. At first, Jess is hurt and angry at being used, but he calms down enough to tell her that he isn't sorry that she came to see him, despite what's happened. Rory later tells her mom she went to see Jess in Philadelphia because he's her friend now. Although the character of Jess does not return again, Luke, Lorelai, and T.J. infrequently refer to him.

Ventimiglia expressed early interest in Jess appearing in the  2016 reboot of the series and later confirmed that Jess will be back.

In the revival, Jess appears to be on good terms with everyone. He last saw Rory 4 years prior. He reports his professional and personal life are stable but not permanent. He returns to Stars Hollow to help Luke take care of his mom, Liz, and, while visiting, encourages Rory to write her own novel, after seeing she's lost professionally. He later provides support for Luke when he's conflicted about Lorelai. He returns to attend the wedding of Luke and Lorelai. He tells Luke he's "long over" his romantic feelings for Rory, but is later shown gazing at her, causing him, and viewers, to wonder if that is actually the truth.

Kirk Gleason

Kirk Gleason, played by Sean Gunn, is a quirky and good-hearted but emotionally stunted, very odd man who until later seasons lives with his mother (when he's not sleeping on park benches or in other people's RVs). By the end of the fourth season, Kirk reveals that he has night terrors that cause him to go streaking through the town naked when they attend the dry run of the Dragonfly Inn. In season 2, ep. 13, Kirk tells Jackson Belleville that he was one of thirteen children (and, it is implied, his mother's least favorite).

Sean Gunn appeared in early episodes as different characters. In season 1, ep. 2 "The Lorelais' First Day at Chilton", Sean Gunn was the DSL installer, named Mick; and in season 1, ep. 3, he is credited as the Swan Man. Kirk becomes a permanent character in season 1, ep. 5, when he is introduced as a new citizen of Stars Hollow (Miss Patty, who knows everyone in Stars Hollow, asks who he is, when meeting him in Doose's market). However, in season 2, ep. 14 Mrs. Kim says: "I know you’re Kirk. I’ve known you since you were two." There are several hints that Kirk has lived in Stars Hollow for years, including going to high school with Luke, and trick-or-treating as a young child on Halloween.

Kirk has had dozens of jobs, such as assistant manager of Doose's Market, cashier at the beauty supply shop, delivery man for various businesses, waiter at Weston's coffee shop, various entrepreneurial activities, photographer, assistant at various town functions, DJ, mailman, employee at the Stars Hollow movie theatre, and realtor-in-training. It became a running gag on the show that in every appearance on the show, Kirk would have a different job or would have started a new business venture.

He had a crush on Lorelai for a while, and asked her out in season 3, ep. 2 "Haunted Leg", but was gently rebuffed.

He started dating his brother's ex-girlfriend Lulu in season 4, ep. 6 "An Affair to Remember." Kirk bid on the historic Twickham house in hopes that he and Lulu might someday raise a family there, but the town elders decided to sell the house to Luke (who later reconsidered and revoked his bid). Kirk later on tells Luke he's thinking of breaking up with Lulu, and Luke threatens to beat him up (Luke's way of saying that Kirk has a great thing going with Lulu, and that breaking up with her would be a stupid thing to do).
Kirk and Lulu remain together throughout the rest of the show. In the 2016 revival, he and Lulu are still together. When they began to discuss the possibility of having kids, the town pitched in to get them a piglet that they name Petal.

Jason Stiles
Jason "Digger" Stiles, played by Chris Eigeman, is the son of Carol (Catherine McGoohan) and Floyd Stiles (Lawrence Pressman). Jason and Lorelai know each other from a camp, where Jason received the nickname "Digger," which stuck. When they met again by chance in early Season 4, Jason soon renewed his acquaintance with Lorelai and began pursuing her romantically. He was persistent in the face of her repeated rejection, and wore her down. They hid the relationship from Lorelai's parents for five months, until the night Floyd informed Richard and Jason that he was suing them because of the clients Jason took with him when he left his father's business - and revealed that he had hired a private investigator to tail Jason.

Richard and Floyd made a deal behind Jason's back that allowed Richard to create a boutique company under the umbrella of Gehrmann-Driscoll, and Richard bad-mouths him to clients and other companies, and Jason finds himself blacklisted. When Jason told Lorelai he was suing her father, she broke off their relationship. Though he tried to win her back, even showing up at the Dragonfly Inn on the night of its test run, Lorelai had already moved on to a relationship with Luke Danes. That night, to get Jason away from the Dragonfly Inn, Sookie and Michel call his cell pretending to be somebody else and tell him his condo is on fire so Jason leaves to go see his home.

He attends Richard's funeral in the first part of the revival and states that he is happy.

Logan Huntzberger

Logan Huntzberger, played by Matt Czuchry, is the second child of Mitchum and Shira Huntzberger (portrayed by Gregg Henry and Leann Hunley). Born in 1982, he is heir to the Huntzberger Publishing Company, a national newspaper conglomerate. The family was modeled after New York Times publisher family, the Sulzberger family. He has a tense relationship with his father. His father seems to view him more of a commodity than a son. His mother has expectations and wants him to marry a trophy wife, even though she doesn't come from money herself. He has an older sister, Honor. He attended many prestigious prep schools, most of which he got kicked out of for the stupid pranks that he played, in the Massachusetts area including Rivers, Groton, and Andover, where it is speculated that he had graduated from. Logan first appears as a traditional chronic ladies man who is more interested in partying than studying. Logan appears to be very well read and versed in pop culture, as he understands most of the references Rory throws his way; and even though he prefers a good time, he does have a talent in newspaper writing and has a vast knowledge of journalism. Due to his wealthy upbringing, he is well traveled, and seems to enjoy heavy drinking and dangerous risk taking. His two best friends are Colin and Finn, both of whom are rich, party loving guys like himself.

Logan first encounters Rory when he and his friends pass by her and her friend Marty. At first, Logan's friends tease Marty and pay little attention to Rory. However, when Logan meets Rory again in the hallway of her dormitory, she takes the opportunity to lecture him on his treatment of Marty. Logan continues to debate with her and promises that he will remember her instantly the next time they meet. Rory's first impression of Logan is not very favorable, viewing him as a typical lazy rich  

boy. However, she goes to him when she needs help on an article about a secret society that Logan is in, called the Life and Death Brigade. She is fascinated by the club and is convinced by Logan to take a dangerous jump off a tall structure, causing Rory to reconsider her initial impression of him. Logan eventually winds up comforting Rory at a party after her break-up with Dean. Rory soon develops a crush on Logan, and while Logan has feelings for her too, he makes it clear he is not a commitment guy, so they agree to a no strings attached relationship. During their relationship, there are signs that both want more, and Rory eventually decides the relationship is too much for her, so she tries to end it. However, Logan takes this as an ultimatum, and agrees to a monogamous relationship. 

Despite family members disapproval and Rory dropping out of Yale, their relationship continues until a break-up in season 6. Logan was threatened by the return of Jess in season 6, even more so when he found out that Jess and Rory had been "high school sweethearts". He treated Jess the same way Jess treated Dean in the past, but wound up alienating Rory further as Jess simply walked away. After Rory argued with Logan about his behavior towards Jess and the aimlessness of their life together, they decided to "take a break". However, Logan saw this as a break-up and proceeded to sleep with his older sister's friends for comfort. Logan attempted to make amends through grand gestures, which included purchasing a coffee cart and barista for Rory's own personal use. Rory accepted the gifts but didn't give in until Logan went to Lorelai for help. He convinced Lorelai that they both had something in common causing Lorelai to agree to help him. Lorelai wrote a letter, and Rory agreed to give Logan another chance. Logan later wound up helping Rory save the Yale Daily News under Paris's tyrannical reign. Rory and Logan moved in together after Paris kicked Rory out because she was mad that Rory was made editor of the paper after Paris was ousted from the position by the newspaper staff. They also go to Martha's Vineyard with Luke and Lorelai. Luke, who has been aloof around Logan, looks at him in a new light when he helps Luke with a Valentine gift for Lorelai. All is well until Rory finds out about his sleeping with his sister's friends during their breakup just before Honor's wedding. After she finds this out she misses Honor's wedding and breaks up with Logan which he takes very badly. She later gets back together with him.

Major recurring characters

Recurring characters

Christopher Hayden

Christopher Hayden, Lorelai's ex-husband and Rory's father, played by David Sutcliffe, first appeared midway through season 1, in episode 14, "That Damn Donna Reed," as an introduction to the next episode "Christopher Returns." He has never visited the girls in Stars Hollow, but surprises them. Rory is thrilled, but Lorelai is reserved. He lies that his business is doing well, but cannot buy a book for Rory without his credit card being declined. The tension and chemistry between Lorelai and Christopher is apparent throughout Chris' visit and Rory begins to hope that her parents might get back together. Things go fine until Lorelai's mother, Emily, finds out that Christopher is staying with the girls and decides to throw a dinner party with Christopher's parents. After an argument between the grandparents, Lorelai and Chris seek seclusion from their families on the balcony (supposedly the site of Rory's conception). They have sex, which Lorelai almost instantly regrets. The next morning Chris asks Lorelai to marry him, but she says "no," believing that he is not ready for the responsibilities of being part of a family.

Christopher reappears during season 2 when he is invited to escort Rory at her coming out party and brings her a copy of the book he tried to buy before as a gift. While in town, he proves that he is more capable of settling down than before, having found a steady job as a consultant for a computer company in Boston and a Volvo. Lorelai begins to think that now is the time for them to pursue a relationship, but Chris states that his girlfriend, Sherry (Mädchen Amick), is the reason for his stability. Sherry and Christopher come to 

a debate of Rory's and the girls, a little blind-sided, decide that Sherry and Rory should spend some time together bonding, while Christopher joins Lorelai at their Friday night dinner. Emily is mad that Christopher gets his life together for someone other than Lorelai and treats him rather coldly at dinner. Christopher then appears when Rory breaks her arm and is the support Lorelai needs. At that point, Chris and Sherry have broken up as have Lorelai and Max, so Christopher and Lorelai agree to try to be a couple. Their happiness is cut short when Christopher gets a call from Sherry saying that she is pregnant. Lorelai and Rory are mad at Christopher and estrange themselves from him. Rory begins to secretly converse with her father after a few months have passed and both are present at the birth of his daughter Georgia, aka Gigi. Christopher misses Rory's high school graduation because of work.

Christopher does not appear in season 4. 

In season 5, Lorelai comes to the rescue when Christopher calls, needing help with his baby daughter, Gigi, after Sherry has left him for a job in Paris. Lorelai is in a happy relationship with Luke at this time. Rory does not want Christopher messing up that relationship, so she tells Chris to stay away from Lorelai. When Christopher's father dies, both Lorelai and Rory realize that he is lonely and that he needs contact with both of them. At Richard and Emily's vow renewal, after being manipulated by Emily before hand, a drunken Chris lashes out at Luke, saying that Lorelai belongs with him and not Luke. Christopher causes drama between Luke and Lorelai as Rory had feared. Luke did not know that she was still in contact with him and becomes very hostile. Lorelai and Luke temporarily split because of this.

In season 6, Christopher has inherited a lot of money from his recently deceased grandfather and asks Lorelai and Rory if there is anything he can do as something of an apology for all his years of neglect. Christopher ends up paying for Rory's Yale tuition thereby upsetting Emily, who thinks Rory and Lorelai will no longer stay in touch. After they assure her that isn't the case, she and Richard are very happy that Christopher is more involved in Lorelai and Rory's lives. An episode deals with how much Christopher spoiled Gigi. Chris goes with Lorelai to Lane's wedding and Lorelai gets very drunk and makes an embarrassing speech about never marrying Luke. In the season six finale, Lorelai gives Luke an ultimatum to marry her and when he says he doesn't like ultimatums, she breaks up with him. In the last scene, a distraught Lorelai goes to Christopher for comfort and, in the season-ending cliffhanger, is seen waking up in Christopher's bed. Christopher and Lorelai begin dating. When Sherry sends a letter saying she has changed her ways and would like Gigi to visit her in France, Christopher invites Lorelai to accompany him. In Paris, they have a romantic time and Christopher impulsively proposes to Lorelai, and they get married in Paris. Christopher and Lorelai's relationship becomes strained again when Christopher says that he wants to have children, but Lorelai said she isn't ready for that now. One night on his way home, Chris gets into a fist fight with Luke, from which neither one emerges the victor. In the end, Lorelai realizes that she has never stopped loving Luke and cannot remain married to Christopher. Christopher makes a final appearance at Rory's college graduation, where he and Lorelai appear to be on good terms.

In the revival, Christopher has taken over the family business. His younger daughter lives in France (presumably with her mom) and he's involved with a woman. He tells Rory he thinks Lorelai was right to raise Rory alone, but maintains he always loved Rory.

Jackson Belleville

Jackson Matthew Belleville is played by Jackson Douglas. Although Jackson's name has regularly been "Melville" (mentioned specifically in season 1's "Christopher 

Returns"); there are several episodes (most recently season 6's "Always A Godmother, Never A God") where it has been "Belleville". The discrepancy is unexplained. Jackson is Stars Hollow's preeminent produce supplier. He takes great pride in providing a top-quality, organic and pesticide-free products to his customers.

Sookie is even more particular about her ingredients than Jackson is, and they frequently argue over the quality of the food. Shared passions and mutual attraction led them to start dating during the first season, and they were married in an outdoor ceremony at the Independence Inn during season 2, ep. 22 "I Can't Get Started". Jackson's father was best man, and pressured Jackson into wearing the same kilt that his father and grandfather had worn at their weddings. Lorelai and Rory were bridesmaids.

Jackson has a very large family, including his cousin Rune, who went on a disastrous blind date with Lorelai and stayed with Jackson for a while, until he overstayed his welcome. Sookie begged Lorelai to give him a job and lodging at the Independence Inn, and she hired him as an (incompetent) handyman.

Jackson is the father of David "Davey" Edward Belleville (Born at the end of season 4, Ep. 7 - The Festival of Living Art) and Martha, middle name Janice Lori Ethan Rupert Glenda Carson Daisy Danny Belleville. (Born season 5, ep. 21 - "Blame Booze And Melville"). His Christian family (denomination unknown) pressured him into baptizing both children at the local church. When the family showed up for the baptism, his mother informed him that he, himself, had never been baptized, and pressured him into going through with the ceremony at the same time as his children. Rory is godmother to Davey, and Lorelai is godmother to Martha. Martha has so many middle names because Jackson had originally planned to have more children. When he and Sookie agreed to stop at two, they decided to use all of the names Jackson planned to use on future children as Martha's middle name(s). In episode 7.12 "To Whom It May Concern", Jackson finally tells Sookie that he didn't get a vasectomy and that she is pregnant again.

Jackson has a tendency to be argumentative and is very protective of his wife, and his plotlines often involve chasing down various members of the Stars Hollow community who have unwittingly wronged her. This usually occurs when Sookie is in a hormonal pregnant state. Much of the comedy of Jackson's character comes from his outrageous reactions to seemingly mundane events.

Jackson and his family live in the house that Sookie owned before she met Jackson.

Jackson successfully ran for town selectman, defeating Taylor Doose, though Jackson realized he did not want the job and resigned.

He is also a notorious fan of band Creedence Clearwater Revival, and the show frequently references them.

Mrs. Kim
Mrs. Kim, played by Emily Kuroda, is a vehemently conservative Korean woman living in Stars Hollow, Connecticut, and she is the mother of Lane Kim, Rory Gilmore's best friend. Notable aspects are her Seventh-day Adventist faith and her vegan diet. She has read the entire Bible in one sitting "just three times", as revealed in season 3. Mrs. Kim is owner of Kim's Antiques, which has a "you break, you buy" policy. Mrs. Kim also rebelled against her mother: Mrs. Kim is a Christian while her mother is a Buddhist, as revealed in season 6. She appears in every season of the series.

Mrs. Kim raised Lane with strict and conservative Korean standards, which often led the outgoing and outspoken Lane to hide several leisure activities from her mother, most notably listening to rock music and becoming a drummer in a rock band. She sent Lane to a Seventh-day Adventist college instead of a state university, believing that she would get all the education she needs from there. In season 4, Mrs. Kim discovers Lane's collection of CDs, hidden in the floorboards of her bedroom, as well as colorful clothing and other items of which Lane knew her mother would disapprove. Lane asks Mrs. Kim for more freedom while continuing to follow her rules while living at home, to which Mrs. Kim objects, telling her that she can live like that some place else. This leaves Lane no other choice but to move out, resulting in much emotional turmoil for them both. Mrs. Kim later hosts a Korean exchange student and evidently turns her into a new daughter that will obey her strict and conservative standards, but Lane soon influences her to not believe everything her mother says. Although it was hard for her at times, Mrs. Kim came to accept her daughter's lifestyle, and later gives her blessing to Lane to marry Zack, her boyfriend and longtime bandmate.

When Lane and Zach returns from their honeymoon, Lane falls ill; they suspect food poisoning, but later discover she is pregnant with twins. Lane fears her mother will officially disown her, but Mrs. Kim gives them her blessing again and quickly decides that they will move back in with her. Lane and Zach ultimately don't move in but Mrs. Kim baby-proofs their house, signifying that she accepts them fully.

Mrs. Kim's husband, Mr. Kim, is never seen. Lane does, however, specifically refer to her father when her parents plan to send her to Korea indefinitely in season 2, and Mrs. Kim mentions him briefly when reminiscing about her wedding night in season 6. Mr. Kim appears briefly in a non-speaking role in "Spring" in Gilmore Girls: A Year in the Life.

Tristin DuGray

Tristin DuGray, played by Chad Michael Murray, was a classmate of Rory's at Chilton. He teased Rory in her first weeks at the school ("The Lorelais' First Day at Chilton," "The Deer Hunters") by calling her 'Mary', meaning a virgin. He then attempted to attract her, consequently upsetting her classmate Paris, who had a crush on him dating back since childhood. He became something of a romantic rival to Rory's first boyfriend, Dean, trying to ask her to a dance and then picking a fight with Dean, who had escorted her instead ("Rory's Dance"). During a short-lived breakup with Dean, Rory and Tristin kissed at a party ("The Breakup, Part 2"), causing her to burst into tears in emotional confusion. Tristin later asked Paris for a date ("The Third Lorelai"), on Rory's advice to find a different type of girl than the kind he usually dated, though he decided afterward that Paris was not his type. In the season-one finale ("Love, Daisies, and Troubadours"), he caused friction between the two girls by lying that Rory had accepted his invitation to a concert, but after watching Rory's passionate reunion with Dean, he walked away alone.

Tristin appeared for the last time in a second-season episode ("Run Away, Little Boy") in which he fell in with a group of troublemakers pulling pranks throughout the school and shirked off his studies, much to the anger and dismay of Paris, who needed him as Romeo in a class Shakespeare project. After spending the week torturing Rory with veiled threats to reveal their one-time kiss to Dean, Tristin found himself forced by his father into attending military school in North Carolina after the pranks went too far, thus leaving Paris to be the Romeo to Rory's Juliet. Before he leaves, Tristin says he would've kissed Rory but Dean was right there. His last words on the show were; "Take care of yourself....Mary." Rory sighed a laugh as he left. (The plot development actually reflected Murray being cast as Lucas Scott on One Tree Hill, which filmed in Wilmington.)

The role was played by Anton Narinskiy in the revival.

Max Medina
Max Arthuro Medina, played by Scott Cohen, was a recurring character in Season 1, and made guest appearances in seasons 2 and 3. He was Rory's English teacher in her sophomore year at The Chilton School, and he went on to become romantically involved with Lorelai.

Max met Lorelai at a parent-teacher meeting ("The Deer Hunter"), where he assured Lorelai that Rory was a fine student and person who would do well in her new school. However, when Rory subsequently overslept and arrived late to his class after studying all night for her English exam, Max initially refused to allow her to take the test, thus incurring Lorelai's wrath. After some initial coldness in a later encounter at a school bake sale, Lorelai agrees to meet him at a coffee shop to talk, away from the Chilton context. Their early attempts to date were hampered by Lorelai's having to cancel in order to attend a wake for her neighbor's beloved cat ("Cinnamon's Wake"), but later they managed a date when his car broke down in her town and he ended up sleeping on the sofa due to heavy snowfall ("Love, War, and Snow"). The couple separated and reunited various times — once leading to a kissing session during Parent's Day at the school — before Max proposes in the season-one finale ("Love, Daisies and Troubadours"). The beginning of Season 2 saw Lorelai accepting the proposal ("Sadie, Sadie"), preparing for the wedding ("Hammers and Veils"), and then cancelling the engagement after comparing her own lack of excitement to her mother's nostalgic memories of her own engagement ("Red Light on the Wedding Night").

Max continued to be Rory's English teacher after the breakup, a situation they discussed briefly when she was assigned to interview him for the school paper by Paris ("Nick & Nora/Sid & Nancy"). He is not seen again that season, but returns to Chilton in Season 3 after teaching at Stanford University for a time; he claims he has recovered from his heartbreak, but a kiss with Lorelai reveals he is not "over" her, prompting Max to decide they should not see each other anymore ("The Big One," "Keg! Max!"). He does not appear again, though he is occasionally mentioned in later episodes.

Taylor Doose
Taylor Doose is played by Michael Winters. Taylor is the Town Selectman for the town of Stars Hollow, and holds a number of other positions in town government and public organizations. He is largely responsible for organizing Stars Hollow's many events and festivals. He is also the owner of Doose's Market, where he employed Dean Forester for the first five seasons, and Taylor's Old Fashioned Soda Shoppe. He is staunchly conservative and provincial in his thought and temperament.

As Stars Hollow's most powerful citizen, Taylor often uses his positions in a rather self-serving manner. He is a stickler for making sure town rules and statutes are followed to the letter. He also has his own opinions about how people should live. Often this brings him in conflict with other members of the community, most often Luke Danes and Lorelai Gilmore. He also is in charge of the frequent town meetings (held at Miss Patty's studio), which he often uses as a forum to air his personal grievances.

During the fifth season, Taylor was briefly voted out of the Town Selectman office after Jackson Belleville ran against him for the office. However, Jackson realized he did not want the job, and resigned.

He remains single throughout the series and never seems to even date (the implication seeming to be his aggressively fussy and self-serving behavior alienates anyone around him). In A Year in the Life, when there are too few people to march in a gay pride parade, several characters strongly hint that he could march in it, though he appears oblivious to their meaning.

Dave Rygalski
Dave Rygalski, portrayed by Adam Brody, is presumably from the Hartford area although his place of residence is never stated. He is a guitarist in the original "Hep Alien" along with Lane Kim, Zach Van Gerbig, and Brian Fuller. Dave is originally introduced in the episode "Application Anxiety" where he is responding to Lane's "drummer seeks rock band" ad.

Dave Rygalski and Lane dated for a while, and when he wished to ask Lane to prom, Mrs Kim quoted Shakespeare at him; which he misinterprets as a quote from the Bible and consequently stays up all night reading the entire Bible to work out if Mrs Kim said yes or no.
When Brody left the show to star in The O.C., his character's absence was explained by sending Dave to college in California (where The O.C. was set); bandmate Zach became Lane's new love interest and eventual husband.

The Rygalski character was inspired by, and named after, the real-life husband of Helen Pai — the show's co-producer, the inspiration for the character of Lane, and whose name is an anagram for the band name, Hep Alien. The real Dave Rygalski shares his namesake's musical hobby and was the inspiration for many of the character's acts of devotion, such as participating in religious activities to please Lane's mother.

Marty
Marty, portrayed by Wayne Wilcox, was briefly introduced in the season four episode "The Hobbit, the Sofa and Digger Stiles" as a student at Yale who "had an unfortunate experience with a keg and a party and a need to take [his] clothes off and fall asleep in a hallway." After Rory tells this story to her mother he is nicknamed "naked guy". He is also adopted.

Shortly after, in "The Fundamental Things Apply", Marty reappeared, fully clothed. He invited a late and dishevelled Rory to eat breakfast with him and a group of his friends, who had adopted the name 'The Breakfast Crew' because it 'wasn't an official club or anything'. Marty appeared once more in that season, albeit briefly.

He made several appearances in season five, including an appearance that seemed to be his last. During this, he went to dinner with Rory Gilmore, Logan Huntzberger and a group of Logan's well-to-do friends, some of whom had treated Marty with a lack of respect in the past asking him 'how he could be so big but yet so very small'. Marty had a horrible time and ended up not being able to afford his split of the bill and begrudgingly accepted Rory's offer to pay for it, promising to pay her back. On return to Rory's dorm, Marty revealed what many had already known, that he had romantic feelings for Rory. Rory rebuffed him, informing him of another fact many (including Marty, to a degree) were already aware of: she liked Logan.

Marty was not seen for nearly two years, until the November 14, 2006 episode, "French Twist". He was shown briefly, near the end of the episode, and was revealed to be in a relationship with Rory's new friend, Lucy (Krysten Ritter). In a move that confused Rory, Marty pretended that he and Rory did not know one another when Lucy introduced the two. When Rory asks him why he relays that he feels it would be weird if Lucy knew they were once friends. Though Rory is still confused, she does not tell Lucy she knows Marty.

In "Knit, People, Knit!", Marty bartends Lucy's birthday party, which Rory attends. Rory took initiative and they smoothed things over, but the newfound peace was quickly ruined as Marty made it obvious that he still had feelings for Rory. In the next episode, "Merry Fisticuffs", Logan, Rory, Marty and Lucy were enjoying dinner together when Lucy inquired as to how Rory and Logan met. Logan answered, honestly, that Marty introduced them because he knew that he still had feelings for Rory. Logan later admitted that he was a bit jealous. Lucy was upset after realizing that both Marty and Rory had been lying. She and Marty end up breaking up. She and Rory become friends again after Rory writes an apology letter to her, and Lucy ultimately realizes the situation wasn't Rory's fault.

Recurring characters

Stars Hollow

 Patricia "Miss Patty" LaCosta (Liz Torres) (2000–2007), Stars Hollow's oft-married, oft-divorced dance instructor. She often makes name-dropping references to her past as a dancer and singer; how much of it is true is unknown. She's usually seen lusting after young men and wishing she could marry again. She and Babette know most of the gossip of the town, though Babette mentions that Patty normally gets the town gossip before her because her phone intercepts other peoples phone calls. After (or perhaps even before) Taylor, she seems to be the most influential citizen of Stars Hollow. Her dance studio is used for town meetings, among other community events.
 Babette Dell (Sally Struthers) (2000–2007), eccentric neighbor and friend to the Gilmore girls. She enjoys singing and music, and appears to have been involved with many singers in the past and had a very "interesting" life. She mentions once having been pushed out of a car, and once joining a cult. Often paired with Miss Patty, Babette is very into gossiping. She also is very protective of her garden gnomes, her favorite being Pierpont. She is married to Morey Dell and has a "child", a cat named Cinnamon. After the cat dies, they adopt a new cat named Apricot. She, at least once, ate oatmeal. She is a very attentive neighbor to the Gilmores, calling for help when she is suspicious of trouble and expressing concern for their well-being.
 Morey Dell (Ted Rooney) (2000–2007), Babette's husband, often plays the piano and has an 'anything-goes' mellow attitude. Always wearing sunglasses, he does whatever Babette tells him and is pretty much her opposite as Babette is loud, short, and plump and Morey is quiet, tall, and lanky.
 Andrew (Mike Gandolfi) (2000–2005), owner of Stars Hollow Books and Revolutionary War re-enacter.
 Joe (Brian Berke) (2000–2006), pizza delivery man and resident of Stars Hollow.
 Harry Porter (David Huddleston) (2000–2001), Stars Hollow's mayor. He appears in two episodes of season 1.
 Drella (Alex Borstein) (2000), a skilled but rude and sarcastic harp player, who worked at the Independence Inn for a while. She appears in four episodes of season one. Borstein, who plays Drella, was originally cast as Sookie but had to drop out after the pilot episode. Borstein returns in later seasons as the characters of Doris (voice only) and Miss Celine.
 Grant (Grant-Lee Phillips) (2001–2007), the town's troubadour.
 Fran Weston (Linda Porter) (2001–2003), owner of Weston's bakery and the run down building of the old Dragonfly Inn. Fran dies in the third season. After her death, Lorelai and Sookie buy the building and remodel it, keeping the name in honor of Fran.
 Rachel (Lisa Ann Hadley) (2001), Luke's intermittent ex-girlfriend from days prior to the time period across which the show is set. She is a traveling photographer, and while she and Luke loved each other, their different lifestyles were ultimately unable to mesh. She returns to Stars Hollow during season 1 but eventually leaves again.
 Clara Forester (Scout Taylor-Compton) (2001–2004), Dean Forester's younger sister. In 2016 revival, she has moved to Berlin with her boyfriend.
 Bootsy (Brian Tarantina) (2001–2002), a Stars Hollow resident who owns and runs the magazine/newspaper stand. He is sometimes a foil for Luke as the two seem to share a common dislike of each other that stems from an incident the two shared in first grade, where Luke blamed Bootsy for ruining a clay handprint of his.
 Tom (Biff Yeager) (2001–2007), a construction contractor in Stars Hollow. He remodels the Twickum House, Lorelai's house, Luke's diner when Luke needs more room and after Kirk ran his car through the window, Taylor's soda shop and both the Independence and Dragonfly Inns.
 Gypsy (Rose Abdoo) (2002–2007), Stars Hollow's wise-cracking mechanic. She is usually one of the first to protest Taylor's harebrained schemes but is nonetheless very involved in town activities.
 Zach Van Gerbig (Todd Lowe) (2002–2007), guitarist and vocalists of Lane's band Hep Alien; he later dates and subsequently marries Lane, and their twin sons Kwan and Steve are born near the end of Season 7. His own father abandoned him when he was ten years old.
Brian Fuller (John Cabrera) (2002–2007), is the bass player of Lane's band, Hep Alien. At one point, Lane, Zach and Brian also share an apartment. Brian is known for having several ailments including asthma, hypoglycemia, a deviated septum, and rosacea. In season six, Brian accidentally causes the band's break-up when he writes a song about Lane, infuriating fellow band member, and Lane's boyfriend, Zach. The band eventually re-unites at Zach and Lane's wedding but disbands once more when Lane becomes pregnant.
 Reverend Archie Skinner (Jim Jansen) (2002–2007, 2016), Stars Hollow's minister. Has a good sense of humor, little patience for Taylor, and a close friendship with Rabbi Barans. He marries Luke and Lorelai in November 2016.
 Rabbi David Barans (Alan Blumenfeld) (2002–2006), Stars Hollow's Rabbi. Like Reverend Skinner, also shows little patience for Taylor and likes to make jokes at his expense.
 Mrs Cassini (Pat Crawford Brown) (2002–2004), resident of Stars Hollow.
 Sophie Bloom (Carole King) (2002–2005, 2016), owner of Stars Hollow's music store
 Gil (Sebastian Bach) (2003–2007), Joins Lane, Zach, and Brian's band Hep Alien, after the band's original guitarist, Dave, moves to California. Gil is much older than the rest of the band, has a wife and kids and owns a sandwich shop. Prior to his days in Hep Alien, he was a member of an unnamed rock band which split up shortly before they could have had their big break. Actor Sebastian Bach was the former singer for the rock band Skid Row. 
 Liz Danes (Kathleen Wilhoite) (2003–2007), Luke's sister; she enters the series as mother to Jess. When she first arrives, Luke is frustrated with her inability to get her life in order, with a history of bad choices and relationships. She later turns her life around when she meets and marries T.J., and she makes a living making and selling jewellery in renaissance fairs. She and T.J. move to Stars Hollow in season six, and the pair have a successful relationship and a child, Doula. Liz becomes Luke's main confidante once he and Lorelai separate. She and Jess are on good terms in 2016.
 T.J. (Michael DeLuise) (2003–2007), husband of Liz and father of Doula. Pretends to be a contractor for a time. His real name is Gary.
 Lulu (Rini Bell) (2003–2007), an elementary school teacher at Stars Hollow who begins dating Kirk. She is eternally cheerful and enthusiastically supports Kirk in even his most bizarre endeavours.
 Kyle (Chauncey Leopardi) (2003–2005), a classmate and friend of Dean's from Stars Hollow High, who went on to lose his hand in the Iraq War and had it replaced by a hook. He doesn't seem to mind though, often making jokes and using his missing hand to attract girls. (Note that when he is in the Navy, his uniform sleeve incorrectly shows two red diagonal stripes, which are service stripes, which would indicate at least 8 years of Naval service.)
 Lindsay Anne Lister Forester (Arielle Kebbel) (2003–2004), dates and then marries Dean after his breakup with Rory; they later divorce after she learns of his affair with Rory.
 Caesar (Aris Alvarado) (2003–2007, 2016), cook at Luke's Diner. Oft-mentioned before finally making his first appearance in season 3 episode 20. He still works for Luke in 2016.
 Yung Chiu (Samson Yi) (2003), a Korean medical student, who "dates" Lane for a while because their parents want them to. In reality, Lane is dating Dave, while Yung Chiu is dating Karen, a Japanese girl his parents don't approve of. Yung Chiu eventually develops real feelings for Lane and refuses to break up with her, while dumping Karen.
 Carrie Duncan (Jill Brennan) (2004–2005), "Crazy Carrie". Liz's high school friend who had a crush on Luke, who also claims to have made out with Luke while both were in high school, which Luke denies.
 Kyon (Susane Lee) (2004–2006), Korean exchange student whom Lane resents because she believes her mother is trying to replace Lane with her after Lane moves out. Kyon later begins rebelling from Mrs. Kim like Lane had, wearing makeup and liking Avril Lavigne, to Lane's amusement.

Chilton

 Hanlin Charleston (Dakin Matthews) (2000–2005, 2007, 2016), the headmaster of Chilton Academy.
 Louise Grant (Teal Redmann) and Madeline Lynn (Shelly Cole) (2000–2004), Paris's best friends, forming a small clique with her in order for Paris to assert her power. Madeline is an effervescent airhead, Louise has a very dry wit, and both are much more interested in dating boys than succeeding academically.
 Henry Cho (Eddie Shin) (2001–2002), a Chilton student who dated Lane.
 Bradley "Brad" Langford (Adam Wylie) (2001–2003), a Chilton student who is scared of Paris; he leaves to perform in Into the Woods on Broadway (analogous with Wylie's real-life stint in the play on Broadway) but returns later on.
 Francine "Francie" Jarvis (Emily Bergl) (2001–2003, 2016), the leader of the Puffs, Chilton's "secret" sorority; recruits Rory (and in turn, Paris) for the club. In season 3, she's the senior class president, often clashing with both Paris and Rory. She returns in A Year in the Life for an appearance in "Spring".

Yale

 Tana Schrick (Olivia Hack) (2003–2004), Rory, Paris, and Janet's roommate during Rory's first year at Yale. Tana is a 16-year-old prodigy, with no idea how to react in most social situations, often giving blunt answers to questions when tact or certain levels of discretion would have been called for.
 Janet Billing (Katie Walder) (2003–2005), Rory, Paris, and Tana's roommate during Rory's first year at Yale. She is very athletic and often gets up in the early hours of the morning, infuriating Paris.
 Glenn Babble (Ethan Cohn) (2003–2005), a Yale student whom Rory befriends. He is often seen as an insecure nervous wreck, worrying about very small things.
 Asher Fleming (Michael York) (2005–2006), a brilliant Yale professor and author who dated Paris and many other female students. He died in season 5.
 Doyle McMaster (Danny Strong) (2003–2007, 2016), editor of the Yale Daily News during Rory's first year at Yale; later begins dating Paris. He is quick to anger and always seems to be stressed. In A Year in the Life, he has since become a successful Hollywood screenwriter married to Paris (though separating from her during the course of the series), analogous with Strong's real-life success as a writer/producer of films and television series such as Empire and The Butler. 
 Robert (Nicholas Holmes) (2005–2006, 2016), member of the Life & Death Brigrade and friend of Logan. He comes to Finn's birthday party with Rory, which makes Logan jealous. When talking to Lorelai, Rory doesn't know his surname and thinks out "Grimaldi".
 Finn (Tanc Sade) (2005–2007, 2016), an extremely eccentric, Australian friend of Logan and Colin at Yale, he is also forever trying to get Rosemary to go home with him. In the fifth season, Finn's catchphrase is "Have we met before?" which he asks Rory many times. When Logan has an accident, he and Colin think about adopting Logan by claiming they're gay.
 Colin McCrae (Alan Loayza) (2005–2007, 2016), a friend of Logan and Finn's at Yale. His dad dated several women so Colin had a lot of different stepmothers. He fell in love with a milkmaid while having vacation in Holland with Finn and Logan.
 Juliet (Riki Lindhome) and Rosemary (Elisabeth Abbott) (2005–2006), friends of Logan and Rory. According to Rosemary, "Juliet hasn't eaten a full meal since 1994."
 Lucy (Krysten Ritter) and Olivia (Michelle Ongkingco) (2006–2007), two existing friends whom Rory befriends at an art gallery in her final year of college. Lucy is dating Marty when Rory meets her, and the circumstances of their breakup leads to a temporary rift between Rory and the girls, but they reconcile and enjoy graduation together. Lucy is particularly quirky, most notably referring to Marty as "Boyfriend" rather than by name during the entire time they are dating. Olivia refers to all things as being "genius".
 Professor Bell (George Anthony Bell) (2003–2007), one of Rory's professors.
 Bill (Devon Michaels), Arthur "A.K." Karlton (Adam Hendershott), Joanna "Joni" (Rona Benson), Sheila (Amy Sloan) and Raj (Danny Pudi) (2006), staff members at the Yale Daily News.

Other

 Lorelai "Trix" Gilmore née Gilmore (Marion Ross) (2001, 2003–2004), The original Lorelai. Richard's mother and Lorelai's grandmother, who dies in the 4th season. Having never approved of Richard's marriage to Emily, whose family came from a lower social standing (in her opinion), she treats Emily with absolute contempt whenever she visits.
 Straub Hayden (Peter Michael Goetz) and Francine Hayden (Cristine Rose) (2001, 2003), parents of Christopher, whose friendship with Lorelai's parents dwindled after Lorelai became pregnant with Rory. Christopher is shown to have a very negative relationship with them. They appear in two episodes. Straub shows a strong dislike toward Lorelai, and even insults Rory. This causes a nearly physical altercation with Richard. When Lorelai was pregnant, Straub suggested abortion, to Emily's strong objection. Straub dies later before ever making amends with his son, or having a relationship with his estranged granddaughter. Francine is shown to be less argumentive, but still resistant in accepting Rory as her granddaughter.
 Jamie (Brandon Barash) (2002, 2004), Paris' first boyfriend.
 Sherry Tinsdale (Mädchen Amick) (2002–2003), Christopher Hayden's girlfriend, whom he later marries and divorces. She later leaves him and Gigi and goes to Paris.
 Nicole Leahy (Tricia O’Kelly) (2003–2004), Taylor's lawyer, whom Luke begins dating and then marries on the spur of the moment on a cruise; they immediately file for divorce, then attempt to reconcile and begin dating again, and then again call it off. Nicole cheats on Luke, and once he finds out that she cheated, the couple break up for good in season 4.
 Alex Lesman (Billy Burke) (2003), dated Lorelai for a short period. Met at a lecture she and Sookie took before starting their Inn.
 Rune (Max Perlich) (2001), Jackson's cousin. After a disastrous date with Lorelai, he is eventually hired as the Independence Inn's handyman. He appears in three episodes.
 Beau Belleville (Nick Offerman) (2003, 2005), Jackson's brother
 Floyd Stiles (Lawrence Pressman) (2004), father of Jason Stiles and Richard's business partner.
 Marilyn (Marion Ross) (2004–2005), Richard's cousin. Actress Marion Ross played Marilyn after the death of her previous character, Trix in the 4th season.
 Aunt Jun (Denice Kumagi) (2004, 2006), Lane's aunt.
 Mitchum Huntzberger (Gregg Henry) (2005–2007, 2016), Logan's father, a frequent antagonist to Logan, Rory and Lorelai.
 Shira Huntzberger (Leann Hunley) (2005), wife of Mitchum and mother of Logan.
 Honor Huntzberger (Devon Sorvari) (2004–2006), Logan's sister.
 April Nardini (Vanessa Marano) (2005–2007, 2016), daughter of Anna and Luke, unknown to Luke until at age 12 when she comes to the diner to obtain a sample of Luke's hair for a school science project. In the revival, she is attending MIT.
 Anna Nardini (Sherilyn Fenn) (2006–2007), sells vintage merchandise; mother, with Luke, of April Nardini. Also plays Sasha, Jimmy Mariano's girlfriend, in season 3.
 Georgia "Gigi" Hayden (Nicolette Collier) (2006–2007), born in the third season to Christopher and Sherry. Rory's half-sister. In 2016 she's living in France.
 Lane's grandmother (June Kyoto Lu) (2006), the mother of Mrs. Kim. Her relationship with her daughter is shown to be similar to the relationship Mrs. Kim has with her own, as all the two do during her visit is argue. She appears to be very critical of her daughter, and appears to be the only character Mrs. Kim will answer to. Their relationship may be based on the fact that she is Buddhist, whereas her daughter is Christian, thus, making them clash at Lane's wedding.
 Matthew (John Sloan) (2006), Jess' colleague at Truncheon Books.

Notable guest stars

Actors
Mädchen Amick (actress known for Twin Peaks) appeared as Sherry Tinsdale, Christopher Hayden's partner and mother of his daughter GiGi.
Alex Borstein (Family Guy voice actress of such voices as Lois Griffin as well as MADtv actress) as Independence Inn harp player Drella, ep 1.1, 1.2, 1. 3, 1.4, and as Emily Gilmore's fashion consultant Miss Celine: 3.21, 5.12 Borstein also has an uncredited part as Doris in episode 3.5 Note: Alex was also the original Sookie and had already shot the pilot, before contract obligations with MADtv intervened; she never appeared in the show as Sookie. Alex Borstein was married to Jackson Douglas, who plays Sookie's husband on the show.
Kathy Baker appeared as Mia, the owner of the Independence Inn in Season 7
Adam Brody (American actor, best known for his role as Seth Cohen on The O C) As Dave (Lane's boyfriend and singer in band), season 3
George Coe (veteran character actor) appeared as Grandpa Huntzberger in episode 19 of season 5.
Eileen Davidson (soap opera actress, guest starred as waitress) Season 5
Sherilyn Fenn as Sasha, Jess's Dad's (Jimmy) live-in girlfriend, ep 3.21 and Anna Nardini, the ex-girlfriend of Luke Danes and protective mother of April Season 6-7
Elizabeth Franz appeared as the owner of the Independence Inn, Mia, in Season 2
Joe Fria appeared as a waiter in ep 1.12 (Double Date) and as an old friend of Sookie's who has feelings for her in ep 3.11 (I Solemnly Swear)
Jon Hamm (American actor, best known for his role as Donald Draper in Mad Men) As Peyton Sanders in Season 3, Episode 5, "Eight O'Clock at the Oasis".
Victoria Justice (actress, singer and dancer, best known roles as Lola Martinez in Zoey 101 and Tori Vega in Victorious.
Jessica "Sugar" Kiper (actress and second runner-up on Survivor: Gabon), as Shane (Jess's girlfriend), season 3
Nancy Lenehan (character actress) guest starred as LaDawn, owner of the Cheshire Cat B&B in ep 2 4
Traci Lords (actress/former adult entertainer) as an interior decorator, Season 4
Seth MacFarlane (Emmy-winning American animator, screenwriter, producer, director, voice actor and creator of Family Guy and co-creator of American Dad!), ep 2.21, 3.11 as fellow graduate of Lorelai
Bruce McCulloch (actor, writer, and director, best known as a member of the comedy troupe Kids in the Hall) as Tobin, night manager of the Independence Inn and day manager of the Dragonfly Inn, in episodes 3.18 and 4.10.
Chad Michael Murray (American actor, best known for his role as Lucas Scott in One Tree Hill) as Tristin DuGray in seasons 1 and 2
Nick Offerman (American actor, best known for his role as Ron Swanson on Parks and Recreation) as Beau Belleville, Jackson's brother in ep 4.7 and 6.4
Max Greenfield (American actor, best known for his role as Schmidt on New Girl) as Lucas a member of Dean's bachelor party in the Episode: "Chicken or Beef?"
Melora Hardin (American actress, best known for her role as Jan Levinson on The Office) as Carolyn Bates, a psychiatrist Emily tries to set Christopher up with in ep 6.22.

Masi Oka (Digital-effects artist and Emmy-nominated actor known for his role as Hiro Nakamura from Heroes) guest starred as a Harvard philosophy student in ep 2.4
Mary Lynn Rajskub (American actress & singer known for her role as Chloe O'Brian on 24) as "Girlfriend" in Kirk's film in ep 2.19 and as Troubadour in ep 6.22
Marion Ross (American actress known for her role as Marion Cunningham on Happy Days) as Lorelai "Trix" Gilmore and her very nice niece Marilyn, ep 1.18 3.10 3.15 4.14 4.16 5.13
Brandon James Routh (credited as B J Routh) (American actor, former fashion model and lead in Superman Returns, Atom/Ray Palmer in the CW Arrowverse series), ep 1.13
Heidi Van Horne as Vintage Girl, hostess of the USO DAR party, season 6
Michael York (actor) as Professor Asher Fleming, Season 4
Jane Lynch, most known for her role in Glee, plays a nurse who annoys Emily Gilmore when Richard Gilmore collapses and is taken into the hospital in season one.
 Rami Malek, best known for his role as Elliot Alderson from Mr. Robot and Oscar-winning performance as Freddie Mercury in Bohemian Rhapsody, guest starred as Andy in episode 4.11. It was his first acting job.

Musicians
Paul Anka (singer) as himself in Lorelai's dream, ep 6.18. In season six, his name was used for Lorelai's dog.
Sebastian Bach (singer, best known as the ex-frontman for Skid Row) as Gil (Lane's bandmate), seasons 4-7
The Bangles (early '80s all-women band) as themselves, ep 1.13
Carole King (American singer, songwriter, and pianist) as music store owner, Sophie Bloom, ep 2.20, 5.18, 6.10. She also sings the show's theme song with her daughter, Louise Goffin.
Pernice Brothers (rock band), ep 6.22
The Shins (indie rock band) as themselves, ep 4.17
Sam Phillips (American singer-songwriter) ep 6.22. Also the music producer for the show.
Grant-Lee Phillips as town troubadour.
Sonic Youth (rock band) members Thurston Moore and Kim Gordon with their daughter, ep 6.22
Sparks (rock band), ep 6.22
Yo la Tengo (rock band), ep 6.22

Politicians and others
Madeleine Albright (64th United States Secretary of State and first woman to hold that position) as Lorelai Gilmore in Rory's dream, ep 6.7
Christiane Amanpour (chief international correspondent for CNN) as herself, ep 7.22
Barbara Levy Boxer (D-California) (American politician and the current junior U.S. Senator from the State of California) as herself, ep 3.1
Norman Kingsley Mailer (American novelist, journalist, playwright, screenwriter and film director) as himself, ep 5.6
Doug Ose (American politician, former Republican member of the United States House of Representatives from 1999 to 2005, representing the 3rd District of California) as himself, ep 3.1

Unseen characters
 Mr. Kim: Lane's father, Mrs. Kim's husband, who is never seen at all but when Lane refers in earlier seasons to her parents rather than just her mother, one would assume that Lane's father is around somewhere. Given Mrs. Kim's strict Christian beliefs and her disdain for Lorelai, it would be out of character to raise Lane by herself. Many of Lane's family show up at her wedding; however, her father is never identified. In response to a question in 2005 on the whereabouts of Mr. Kim, Amy Sherman-Palladino said, "We referred to Lane's dad in the first and second seasons, and then we treated Lane like she had no dad. And every now and then we ask ourselves, 'Are we ever going to see Lane's dad?' We talk about having a scene where there's this room in the back of the house and [Mrs. Kim] walks in and there's a little man with a cup of tea — and that's Lane's dad." Despite that idea, Mr. Kim was never shown, and no explanation is ever given for why he stopped being mentioned and later seasons only refer to Lane's mother. He has a non-speaking role in the revival. He's also shown during a wedding.
 Al: owner and manager of Al's Pancake World. Al decided several years ago to stop serving pancakes and focus on international cuisine, but kept the "Pancake World" name as he already had napkins made up with the logo. The quality of his food can be erratic, but events such as International Grab Bag Night make it the Gilmores' second favorite eating establishment (after Luke's).
 Bitty Charleston: Hanlin Charleston's wife and a good friend of Emily; often mentioned when Emily hears news of Chilton and Rory before Lorelai does.
 Mrs. Gleason: Kirk's overbearing mother who won't let him have a key and who mothered a lot of children of whom Kirk is the youngest. Kirk still lives with her, but tries to stay out of the house for as long as possible – often inhabiting Luke's until closing time. (She is heard when Kirk leaves a message on Lorelai's answering machine in season 3)
 Sookie's third child: The show finished before Sookie was able to give birth to her third child, which was written in due to Melissa McCarthy's real-life pregnancy with her first child.
 East Side Tilly: a rival of Miss Patty and Babette. Miss Patty and Babette are always mentioning new gossip of East Side Tilly. All mentions of her are negative in some way, except for in the finale, when she provides much-needed tablecloths at the last minute.

Notes

References

Characters